Z88DK is a Small-C-derived cross compiler for a long list of Z80 based computers. The name derives from the fact that it was originally developed to target the Cambridge Z88. Z88DK is much developed from Small-C and it accepts many features of ANSI C with the notable exception of multi-dimensional arrays and prototyped function pointers. Later version also supports SDCC as compiler.

It has been used for many software and hardware projects, notably the REX DK (targeted to the REX 6000 platform) and the S1 SDK (targeted to the S1 MP3 Player) teams.

The compiler is highly portable, and is known to be run on AmigaOS, BeOS, HP-UX 9, Linux, BSD, Mac OS X, Solaris, Win64, Win32, Win16 and MS-DOS.

Supported target platforms 
As of the  Z88DK supports the following target platforms:

 Amstrad CPC
 Amstrad NC100
 Amstrad NC200
 Cambridge Z88
 Camputers Lynx
 Canon X-07
 Casio PV-1000
 Casio PV-2000
 CCE MC-1000
 Commodore 128 (in Z80 mode)
 CP/M based machines
 EACA Colour Genie EG2000
 Enterprise 64 and 128
 Epson PX-4
 Epson PX-8
 Exidy Sorcerer
 Galaksija
 Grundy NewBrain
 Jupiter Ace
 Lambda 8300
 Luxor ABC 80
 Luxor ABC 800
 Mattel Aquarius
 Memotech MTX
 MSX
 Nascom 1 and 2
 NEC PC-6001
 NEC PC-8801
 Pac-Man arcade cabinet hardware
 Philips P2000
 Philips VG5000
 C7420 module for the Philips Videopac + G7400
 Rabbit 2000/3000/4000 platform
 SAM Coupé
 Sega Master System
 Sega SC-3000
 Sharp MZ series
 Sharp OZ/QZ 700 family palmtop organizers
 Sharp X1
 Sinclair ZX80
 Sinclair ZX81
 Sord M5
 S-OS
 Spectravideo SVI
 Peters Plus Sprinter
 Tatung Einstein
 TI calculators (TI-82, TI-83 series, TI-84 Plus series, TI-85, TI-86)
 Timex Sinclair 2068
 Toshiba Pasopia 7
 TRS 80
 VTech VZ200/300 (also known as Laser 200)
 Xircom REX 6000 (also known as DataSlim)
 ZX Spectrum

See also 
 Retargetable compiler
 Microcontroller
 SDCC

References

External links 
 Z88DK Main website
 Z88DK Documentation

C (programming language) compilers
Cross-compilers
Z80